The Boys' 55 kg tournament in Judo at the 2010 Summer Youth Olympics was held on August 21 at the International Convention Centre.

This event was the lightest of the boy's judo weight classes, limiting competitors to a maximum of 55 kilograms of body mass.  The tournament bracket consisted of a single-elimination contest culminating in a gold medal match. There was also a repechage to determine the winners of the two bronze medals. Each judoka who had lost before the finals competed in the repechage with the two finalists getting bronze medals.

Medalists

Results

Main Bracket

Repechage

References

External links
 

B55
Judo at the Youth Olympics Boys' 55 kg